The Revölution by Night is the ninth studio album by American hard rock band Blue Öyster Cult, released on November 8, 1983. The album was intended to capitalize on the success of Fire of Unknown Origin two years prior, hence the blend of straight-ahead rock and pop elements. This was the first BÖC album not to feature all of the band's classic members, drummer Albert Bouchard having been fired during the previous tour and replaced by roadie Rick Downey.

In contrast to the success of Fire of Unknown Origin, the album failed to go Gold in the United States.

Songs
Lead single "Shooting Shark" was modestly successful on radio, reaching #83  and #16 on the Billboard Hot 100 and Mainstream Rock charts, respectively.
Its accompanying video became one of MTV's most requested clips upon its release. The lyrics to "Shooting Shark" were based on a poem by Patti Smith.

"Take Me Away," co-written by Eric Bloom and Canadian rock musician Aldo Nova, also received significant airplay on AOR. An earlier version of the song, titled "Psycho Ward", was being written by Nova before Bloom offered to contribute some lyrics, coming up with the chorus. The song reached #11 on the Billboard Mainstream Rock chart. A music video was created for the song and was featured on MTV.

Track listing

Personnel 
Band members
Eric Bloom – guitar, vocals
Donald 'Buck Dharma' Roeser – lead guitar, keyboards, vocals, mixing (uncredited)
Allen Lanier – piano, keyboards
Joe Bouchard – bass, electric and acoustic guitars, vocoder, vocals
Rick Downey – drums

Additional musicians
Larry Fast – synthesizers, programming
Aldo Nova – guitar and synthesizers on "Take Me Away"
Gregg Winter – backing vocals on "Eyes on Fire"
Randy Jackson – bass on "Shooting Shark"
Marc Baum – saxophone on "Shooting Shark"

Production
Bruce Fairbairn – producer, mixing
Dave Wittman – engineer
George Geranios, Ken Kessie – additional engineering
Chris Isca, Ron Coté, Ray Pyle – assistant engineers
Bob Ludwig – mastering
Sandy Pearlman – management, mixing (uncredited)
Steve Schenck – management

Charts

Album

Singles

Shooting Shark

Take Me Away

References

Blue Öyster Cult albums
1983 albums
Albums produced by Bruce Fairbairn
Columbia Records albums